Alba de  Céspedes y Bertini (11 March 1911 – 14 November 1997) was a Cuban-Italian writer.

Family
De Céspedes was the daughter of Carlos Manuel de Céspedes y Quesada (a Cuban ambassador to Italy) and his Italian wife, Laura Bertini y Alessandri.  Her grandfather was Carlos Manuel de Céspedes, who is the father of the nation of Cuba, and a distant cousin was Perucho Figueredo. She was married to Franco Bounous of the Italian foreign service, later ambassador to Cyprus and Pakistan.

Her work
De Céspedes worked as a journalist in the 1930s for Piccolo, Epoca, and La Stampa.  In 1935, she wrote her first novel, L’Anima Degli Altri.  Her fiction writing was greatly influenced by the cultural developments that lead to and resulted from World War II. In her writing, she instills her female characters with subjectivity. In her work, there is a recurring motif of women judging the rightness or wrongness of their actions. In 1935, she was jailed for her anti-fascist activities in Italy.  Two of her novels were also banned (Nessuno Torna Indietro (1938) and La Fuga (1940)). In 1943, she was again imprisoned for her assistance with  Radio Partigiana in Bari where she was a Resistance radio personality known as Clorinda. From June 1952 to the late 1958 she wrote an advice column, called Dalla parte di lei, in the magazine Epoca. She wrote the screenplay for the Michelangelo Antonioni 1955 film Le Amiche. Her work was also part of the literature event in the art competition at the 1936 Summer Olympics.

After the war she went to live in Paris. Although her books were bestsellers, De Céspedes has been overlooked in recent studies of Italian women writers.

Select bibliography 
L’Anima Degli Altri (1935)
Prigionie (1936)
Io, Suo Padre (1936)
Concerto (1937)
Nessuno Torna Indietro [There's No Turning Back] (1938)
La Fuga (1940)
Il Libro del Forestiero (1946)
Dalla Parte Di Lei [The Best of Husbands] (1949)
 
 
 
Gli Affetti Di Famiglia (1952)
Tra Donne De Sole (1955)
Invito A Pranzo (1955)
Prima E Dopo [Between Then and Now] (1956)
Il Rimorso (1967)
La Bambalona (1967)
Chansons des filles de mai (1968)
Sans Autre Lieu Que La Nuit (1973)
Nel Buio Della Notte (1976)

Visit to Cuba 
De Céspedes in October 1968 attended the centennial of Cuba's struggle for independence celebrations. One of the events, attended by Fidel Castro, was held in Manzanillo, Cuba, where her grandfather, Carlos Manuel de Céspedes, on 10 October 1868, had made a speech against Spain which started the Ten Years' War. She also during that trip donated to the Cuban National Archives letters written by her grandfather between 1871 and 1874 to his wife.

References

 
 Time magazine article
 Cuba Cultura article 

20th-century Cuban poets
20th-century Cuban novelists
1911 births
1997 deaths
Writers from Rome
Cuban women poets
Italian anti-fascists
Italian resistance movement members
Italian women novelists
Italian women journalists
Cuban women novelists
20th-century Italian women writers
20th-century Italian novelists
20th-century Italian poets
Olympic competitors in art competitions
Female anti-fascists